VfL Wolfsburg won their first ever Bundesliga title during this season. Manager Felix Magath formed an attacking lineup, which included strikers Edin Džeko and Grafite, the pair scoring 54 goals between them, much due to the help of attacking midfielder Zvjezdan Misimović's 20 assists.

Players

First-team squad
Squad at end of season

Left club during season

Competitions

Bundesliga

League table

Matches

DFB-Pokal

UEFA Cup

First round

Group stage

Round of 32

Statistics

Top scorers

Bundesliga
  Grafite (28)
  Edin Džeko (26)
  Zvjezdan Misimović (7)

DFB-Pokal
  Edin Džeko (6)
  Grafite (4)

References

Notes

Sources
  Soccerbase - Wolfsburg Results

VfL Wolfsburg seasons
Wolfsburg
German football championship-winning seasons